The Chapel of Saint Paul (Kanīsat Mar Bawlus) is a church in Damascus, Syria, located along Tarafa bin al-Abd Street near the former Bab Kisan (Kisan Gate).

The chapel, consecrated in 1939, includes some stones from the Bab Kisan, which is believed to be the site of St Paul's escape from Damascus by being lowered out of a window in a basket.

See also
 Related Bible parts: Acts 9:25, 2 Corinthians 11:33

References

Churches in Damascus
Melkite Greek Catholic churches
Melkite Greek Catholic Church in Syria